In category theory, an end of a functor  is a universal extranatural transformation from an object e of X to S.

of X with  
for every object a of C.

By abuse of language the object e is often called the end of the functor S (forgetting ) and is written

Characterization as limit: If X is complete and C is small, the end can be described as the equalizer in the diagram

Coend 
The definition of the coend of a functor  is the dual of the definition of an end.

Thus, a coend of S consists of a pair , where d is an object of  X and 
is an extranatural transformation, such that for every extranatural transformation  there exists a unique morphism

The coend d of the functor S is written

Characterization as colimit: Dually, if X is cocomplete and C is small, then the coend can be described as the coequalizer in the diagram

Examples
Natural transformations:

Suppose we have functors  then

.

In this case, the category of sets is complete, so we need only form the equalizer and in this case

Looking at the equalizer diagram defining the end makes the equivalence clear.
Geometric realizations:

Let  be a simplicial set. That is,  is a functor . The discrete topology gives a functor , where  is the category of topological spaces. Finally there is a functor  that takes the product of two topological spaces.

Notes

References

External links
 

Functors